Black Creek Drive is a four lane north–south arterial road in  Toronto, Ontario, Canada. It connects Weston Road and Humber Boulevard with Highway 401 via Highway 400, the latter of which it forms a southerly extension. Black Creek Drive officially transitions into Highway400 at the Maple Leaf Drive overpass, southeast of Jane Street. The roadway is named after the Black Creek ravine, which it parallels for most of its route. As a municipal road, it is patrolled by the Toronto Police Service.

Following the path of a proposed freeway extension of Highway400, it was built instead as an arterial road with at-grade intersections by the provincial government. While Metropolitan Toronto and the Province of Ontario sought to extend Highway400 south to the Gardiner Expressway, public opposition to building freeways into central Toronto resulted in the road being constructed as an arterial road instead.

Route description 

At its south end, Black Creek Drive begins at an intersection with Weston Road and Humber Boulevard, in the Mount Dennis neighbourhood of Toronto. The four-lane road passes beneath railway tracks that carry the Kitchener GO Line and Union Pearson Express rail corridors. It travels north alongside Black Creek, from which it takes its name; Keelesdale Park lies to the east. The road continues north–northwest, intersecting Eglinton Avenue West. Coronation Park and Trethewey Park occupy the eastern side of the road north of Eglinton, while the western side is occupied by commercial and industrial uses.
Much of this land was a former Kodak plant, marked today only by the existence of Photography Drive.
Between Trethewey Drive and Lawrence Avenue West, the road passes between residential subdivisions within the Black Creek ravine. North of Lawrence, the road diverges from the Black Creek ravine. It is separated at-grade from Queens Drive and Maple Leaf Drive, which pass overhead.

At the Maple Leaf Drive overpass, Black Creek Drive becomes Highway 400 and thereafter falls under the control of the Ministry of Transportation of Ontario.
The road has signalized intersections at Photography Drive, Eglinton Avenue West, Todd Bayliss Boulevard, Trethewey Drive and Lawrence Avenue West. From Trethewey north, the two directions are separated by a concrete barrier, and north of Lawrence, the directions are separated by a set of steel guard rails. South of Trethewey, the two directions are separated by a grass median.
Bicycles and pedestrians are banned from using the roadway or paved shoulders north of Eglinton Avenue.

History 
Black Creek Drive forms the southerly extension to Highway400, and was originally intended as part of a proposed expressway that would have connected Highway401 with the Gardiner Expressway, via the Crosstown Expressway.
A piece of a larger plan to expand a network of expressways across Toronto, the route was instead completed as a compromise between Metropolitan Toronto and the provincial government, as part of the larger Spadina Expressway controversy.
The goal of Metro Toronto was to establish a network of expressways across and into Toronto, including the Crosstown Expressway north of Dupont Street, and the Richview Expressway along Eglinton Avenue West.
Plans were conceived to extend Highway400 south from Highway401 to Eglinton Avenue, where it would join those two new expressways.
These plans would never reach fruition, as public opposition to urban expressways cancelled most highway construction in Toronto by 1971.

The proposed route of the Highway400 extension would have followed Weston Road as well as the right-of-way of the Canadian Pacific Railway, then east along Dupont Street to connect with the Crosstown Expressway at present-day Christie Street. From there it would branch southward along Christie and Clinton Streets to the Gardiner Expressway. Alternate alignments included one following Parkside Drive south to the Gardiner, and one following the Canadian National Railway tracks south to Front Street and the Gardiner Expressway.

The provincial government began construction of an extension of Highway400 as far south as Jane Street in 1965, which was completed and opened on October28, 1966,
while the remainder of the plans were shelved following the cancellation of the Spadina Expressway in 1971.
The provincial government still owned the right-of-way along the Black Creek Valley and agreed to construct it as a four-lane arterial road, instead of a grade-separated expressway. The Metro Toronto government agreed to extend it farther south to St. Clair Avenue.

Fresh from battling the Spadina Expressway, anti-Spadina groups started battling the extension and soon, Parkdale residents joined in the debate, fearing an extension would pass directly through their neighbourhood.
Additionally, the City of Toronto objected to the construction of the road south to St. Clair Avenue. A compromise was reached at Weston Road; the 400 Extension would end there, but Weston Road would be widened to support the flow of traffic from Black Creek Drive. Construction began in late 1977.

Black Creek Drive opened in 1982 from Jane Street south to Weston Road. On March 1, 1983, Metro Council performed a land transfer in which the right-of-way for the Spadina Expressway south of Eglinton was assumed by the province in exchange for Black Creek Drive being transferred to Metro.
In 1989, Metro Toronto initiated a study of the extension of Black Creek Drive south to the Gardiner Expressway.

Major intersections

See also
 Cancelled expressways in Toronto

Citations

References

External links

 Black Creek Drive - Length and Route

Roads in Toronto